Luis Lucas Alcaraz González (born 21 June 1966) is a Spanish retired footballer, currently manager of UD Ibiza.

In a managerial career of over two decades, he competed in ten La Liga seasons at the helm of Recreativo, Racing de Santander, Granada and Levante. He was also in charge of eight clubs in Segunda División, winning promotion with Recreativo and Murcia, and had a brief spell in international selection with Algeria.

Football career
Born in Granada, Andalusia, Alcaraz started coaching with Granada CF in 1995 at the age of 29, achieving two top-four finishes in the third division in his three-year spell but failing to promote in the playoffs. In the following two seasons he managed in the same tier and region, with Almería CF and Dos Hermanas CF, suffering relegation with the former.

In June 2000, 34-year-old Alcaraz signed for Recreativo de Huelva, helping the oldest club in Spain return to La Liga after an absence of 23 years in 2002 behind champions Atlético Madrid and Racing de Santander. Even though Recre returned to the second level immediately, they also managed to reach the final of the Copa del Rey, losing 0–3 to RCD Mallorca.

Alcaraz then moved to Racing Santander, being sacked midway through the 2004–05 campaign due to bad results. He spent the following two seasons in the second division, helping Real Murcia to promote in 2007 but being immediately relegated afterwards – he was fired on 6 March 2008 – and meeting the same fate with his following club, Recreativo.

In the summer of 2009, Alcaraz signed with another team in his native Andalusia, Córdoba CF (second level), helping the side finish tenth in his first season. In late June 2011, he re-joined Almería – now called Unión Deportiva – recently relegated from the top flight.

On 3 April 2012, after only four points in six games and no wins, Alcaraz was relieved of his duties. On 30 January of the following year, after a very short spell in Greece with Aris Thessaloniki FC, he returned to his country and Granada, with the club now in the top tier.

Alcaraz was appointed at Levante UD on 21 October 2014, replacing fired José Luis Mendilibar after just eight rounds. On 25 October of the following year, following a 0–4 home defeat to Real Sociedad, he was sacked.

On 11 June 2016, Alcaraz was announced as the new Elche CF manager, only to refuse the job six days later. On 3 October, he began his third spell at Granada.

As the team stood second from the bottom in the table, Alcaraz was relieved of his duties on 10 April 2017. Three days later, he was appointed at the helm of the Algeria national side, but was fired in October after failing to qualify to the 2018 FIFA World Cup, receiving a €345,000 payout.

Alcaraz returned to Almería on 16 November 2017, replacing Luis Miguel Ramis. He resigned the following 24 April, after an eight-match winless run.

On 22 October 2018, Alcaraz was appointed Real Zaragoza manager in the place of sacked Imanol Idiakez. On 17 December, he was himself dismissed.

Alcaraz was named manager of Albacete Balompié on 3 February 2020, still in the second division, He was relieved of his duties on 13 October, just five matches into the new season.

On 29 December 2021, Alcaraz moved to Cyprus with Olympiakos Nicosia, but left after collecting no wins in eight games. In November 2022, he became UD Ibiza's third manager of the second-tier campaign.

Personal life
Alcaraz's father, Felipe, was a politician and a writer, being a longtime secretary-general of the Communist Party of Andalusia. His grandfather was Manuel González, and his namesake his uncle.

Managerial statistics

References

External links

1966 births
Living people
Spanish footballers
Footballers from Granada
Association footballers not categorized by position
Granada CF footballers
Spanish football managers
La Liga managers
Segunda División managers
Segunda División B managers
Granada CF managers
UD Almería managers
Recreativo de Huelva managers
Racing de Santander managers
Xerez CD managers
Real Murcia managers
Córdoba CF managers
Levante UD managers
Elche CF managers
Real Zaragoza managers
Albacete Balompié managers
UD Ibiza managers
Super League Greece managers
Aris Thessaloniki F.C. managers
Cypriot First Division managers
Olympiakos Nicosia managers
Algeria national football team managers
Spanish expatriate football managers
Expatriate football managers in Greece
Expatriate football managers in Algeria
Expatriate football managers in Cyprus
Spanish expatriate sportspeople in Greece
Spanish expatriate sportspeople in Algeria
Spanish expatriate sportspeople in Cyprus